Raasiku FC Joker are a football club based in Raasiku, Estonia, who play in the III liiga.

History

Players

Current squad
 ''As of 1 April 2018.

References

Football clubs in Estonia
Association football clubs established in 1993
1993 establishments in Estonia
Raasiku Parish